Häntzschel or Haentzschel is a German surname. Notable people with the surname include:

 Georg Haentzschel (1907–1992), German pianist, broadcaster, composer, and arranger
 Walter Häntzschel  (1904–1972), German paleontologist

German-language surnames